Bob Gould (1863 – 29 December 1931) was a Welsh international rugby union forward who played club rugby for Newport Rugby Football Club. He won 11 caps for Wales and captained them for one match. Gould is best known within the sport of rugby as the brother of Arthur 'Monkey' Gould, one of the first superstars of Welsh rugby.

Rugby career 
Gould played most of his club rugby with Newport, spending 8 seasons with the club between 1879 and 1887. He captained Newport in his final season.

International career
Gould was first capped for Wales against Ireland on 28 January 1882. He would play for Wales a further 10 times, captaining the team against Scotland on 26 February 1887. Gould would play his last five international games with his younger brother Arthur and the Scotland game of 1885 is noted as being the first international rugby game to have brothers on both sides. The Goulds for Wales and George and Richard Maitland for Scotland.

International matches played
Wales
 1882, 1884, 1885, 1886, 1887
 1882, 1884
 1883, 1884, 1885, 1887

Bibliography

References 

1863 births
1931 deaths
London Welsh RFC players
Newport RFC players
Richmond F.C. players
Rugby union centres
Rugby union players from Newport, Wales
Wales international rugby union players
Wales rugby union captains
Welsh rugby union players